Heartsill Ragon (March 20, 1885 – September 15, 1940) was a United States representative from Arkansas and a United States district judge of the United States District Court for the Western District of Arkansas.

Education and career

Born on March 20, 1885, in Dublin, (an unincorporated community in Cane Creek Township, Logan County), Arkansas, Ragon attended the common schools, Clarksville High School, the College of the Ozarks (now the University of the Ozarks) in Clarksville and graduated from the University of Arkansas in Fayetteville. He received a Bachelor of Laws in 1908 from the Washington and Lee University School of Law. He was admitted to the bar in 1908 and entered private practice in Clarksville, Arkansas from 1908 to 1923. He was a member of the Arkansas House of Representatives from 1911 to 1913. He was district attorney in Clarksville from 1916 to 1920.

Party political posts

Ragon was Secretary of the Democratic Arkansas state convention in 1918, Chairman of the Democratic Arkansas state convention in 1920, and a delegate to the 1920 Democratic National Convention.

Congressional service

Ragon was elected as a Democrat to the United States House of Representatives of the 68th United States Congress and to the five succeeding Congresses and served from March 4, 1923, until his resignation effective June 16, 1933, having been appointed to the federal bench.

Federal judicial service

Ragon was nominated by President Franklin D. Roosevelt on May 12, 1933, to a seat on the United States District Court for the Western District of Arkansas vacated by Judge Frank A. Youmans. He was confirmed by the United States Senate on May 12, 1933, and received his commission on May 17, 1933. His service terminated on September 15, 1940, due to his death in Fort Smith, Arkansas. He was interred in Forest Park Cemetery in Fort Smith.

United States v Miller

In 1939, Ragon authored an opinion in United States v. Miller, 26 F. Supp. 1002, stating that a federal statute violated the Second Amendment. Ragon was in reality, in favor of the gun control law and was part of an elaborate plan to give the government a sure win when they appealed to the supreme court which they promptly did. Miller, who was a known bank robber, had just testified in court against his whole gang and would have to go into hiding as soon as he was released. Ragon knew that Miller would not pay for an attorney to argue the case at the supreme court and so the government would have a sure win because the other side would not show up. The plan worked perfectly. His opinion was reversed by the United States Supreme Court in United States v. Miller (1939).

References

Sources

External links 
 
 

1885 births
1940 deaths
20th-century American judges
Arkansas lawyers
Democratic Party members of the United States House of Representatives from Arkansas
Democratic Party members of the Arkansas House of Representatives
Judges of the United States District Court for the Western District of Arkansas
United States district court judges appointed by Franklin D. Roosevelt
People from Clarksville, Arkansas
University of the Ozarks alumni
University of Arkansas alumni
Washington and Lee University School of Law alumni